Bantwala or Bantawala is a major railway station on Mangalore–Hassan–Mysore line. It is located in BC Road, Bantwal, Dakshina Kannada district, Karnataka state, India. It consists of two platforms. This railway station is nearest railway station to National Highway in Dakshina Kannada district. This railway station is located just 500 meters away from NH 75 and three kilometers away from Bantwal city.

Location 
Bantwala Railway Station serves Bantwal city of Dakshina Kannada district. It belongs to Mysuru railway division part of South Western Railway zone of Indian Railways.

Services 
There are several trains to Mangaluru, Puttur,Subrahmanya, Karwar, Kannur, Vijayapura, Yesvantpur, Bengaluru, Mysuru, Hubballi which stops at Bantwal railway station.

References 

Railway stations in Dakshina Kannada district